D'Antignac Swamp is a swamp in the U.S. state of Georgia.

D'Antignac Swamp was named after William D'Antignac, the original owner of the site.

References

Swamps of Georgia (U.S. state)
Bodies of water of Burke County, Georgia